Lorenzo Borghese (born June 9, 1972) is an Italian-American businessman, television personality, and member of the Borghese family. Borghese is a cosmetics entrepreneur and animal rights advocate. He was also the bachelor on the ninth season of ABC's The Bachelor, where he picked Jennifer Wilson, and remained in contact with Erica Rose.

He is the son of Prince Francesco Marco Luigi Costanzo Borghese (born 1938) and Amanda Borghese, his American wife and the stepdaughter of Douglas Leigh. Borghese's paternal grandmother was Princess Marcella Borghese, who founded the Borghese cosmetics line in 1958.

Early life and education
Borghese was born on June 9, 1972, in Milan, Italy. Borghese's parents, Francesco and Amanda Borghese, have lived in Short Hills, New Jersey, since 1979. He holds dual U.S./Italian citizenship. Raised in Short Hills, he attended elementary school there. He then graduated from Pomfret School in Pomfret, Connecticut, in 1991. In 1995, he graduated from Rollins College in Winter Park, Florida, where he was initiated into the Phi Delta Theta fraternity.

He earned an MBA degree from the Fordham Graduate School of Business in 2001.

Business and philanthropy
Borghese resides in New York City. He founded the Royal Treatment line of products, a bath, body and skin care line for pets that uses organic ingredients and fragrance oils from Italy and is sold in U.S. stores and on the television station HSN. He is a managing partner in LB2, LLC, a private-label Italian cosmetics company that sells numerous brands to major department stores and direct retail outlets.

Reality television and author
In the fall of 2006, Borghese starred in the ninth season of ABC's reality show The Bachelor.

In the summer of 2009, Borghese announced he would be searching for his "princess" on a web reality show titled America's Next Princess. The show was to coincide with the launch of Royal Pet Club, an online shopping website for his Royal Treatment pet products. However, when the show debuted online on August 17, 2009, the series was revealed to actually be a spoof of celebrities and reality TV shows.

In August and September 2012, he appeared on the 10th season of Celebrity Big Brother UK and was evicted from the house on Day 22, ultimately finishing in 8th place.

Titles
Italian titles of nobility are unrecognized since the 1948 Italian Constitution. Lorenzo Borghese's father is representative of the titles of Duke of Bomarzo, Prince of Sant’Angelo e San Polo, Marquess of Monticelli, Count of Chia, Lord of Attigliano e Mugnano. As a second son however, Lorenzo Borghese is not entitled to use these titles. Even in a purely social context, he is styled Don Lorenzo dei principi Borghese, Roman noble, Noble of Corneto, Patrician of Venice, Patrician of Naples, Patrician of Genoa.

References

Sources

External links

Royal Pet Club

1972 births
American cosmetics businesspeople
Businesspeople from New Jersey
Businesspeople from New York City
Lorenzo
Italian emigrants to the United States
Living people
Nobility from Milan
People from Millburn, New Jersey
Rollins College alumni
Fordham University alumni
Pomfret School alumni
Bachelor Nation contestants